Barra Rio Grande Lighthouse is an active lighthouse located on a sandy strip between the Lagoa dos Patos and the South Atlantic Ocean in the municipality of São José do Norte, Brazil.

History
The first lighthouse, a lantern atop the tower of the Commander of the Port, was established since 1 December 1820, but went out of order at the first storm. Since then a fire was lit in order to direct safely the ships to the harbour. In 1827 was asked to Pedro I of Brazil to rebuild the lighthouse, only on 2 August 1842 it was relit. At first the lantern was equipped with a catoptrics system replaced in 1886 by a 2nd order of Fresnel lens built by Barbier and Fenestre. The lighthouse was painted in red, then in  dark red and at last with black and white horizontal bands. The lighthouse is managed by Brazilian Navy and is identified by the country code number BR-4008.

See also
List of lighthouses in Brazil

References

External links

  Centro de Sinalização Náutica Almirante Moraes Rego

Lighthouses in Brazil